Neal Salisbury (1940–2022) was an American historian and university professor. He specialized in native American history.

Biography 

He was born in 1940 in Los Angeles.

He was married to Dana Wallach Salisbury and had one daughter.

He died on May 27, 2022.

Education 

He completed his bachelor's and master's degree from UCLA.

He studied under Gary Nash who convinced him to become a historian.

Career 

He served as the Barbara Richmond 1940 Professor Emeritus in the Social Sciences at Smith College from 1973 to 2014.

Awards 

He has been awarded fellowships by the Smithsonian Institution, the Newberry Library, the National Endowment for the Humanities, the Charles Warren Center at Harvard, the National Humanities Center, the American Antiquarian Society, and the American Council of Learned Societies.

He was also named an honorary member of the Colonial Society of Massachusetts and was the Mellon Distinguished Scholar in Residence at the American Antiquarian Society.

Bibliography 

His notable books include:

 Sovereignty and the Goodness of God & Autobiography of Benjamin Franklin & Cherokee Removal

 The Enduring Vision: A History of the American People

 A New Order of Things: Property, Power, and the Transformation of the Creek Indians, 1733–1816

 The Plains Sioux and U.S. Colonialism from Lewis and Clark to Wounded Knee

 The Enduring Vision: A History of the American People, Volume I: To 1877

 Manitou and Providence: Indians, Europeans, and the Making of New England, 1500–1643

References

External links 
 Official Website
 Organization of American Historians

American historians
American academics
1940 births
2022 deaths